The Murray River is a river in the southwest of Western Australia. It played a significant part in the expansion of settlement in the area south of Perth after the arrival of British settlers at the Swan River Colony in 1829.

The river is one of the few major rivers close to Perth which is devoid of dams for public water supply.

The first of the two major tributaries, the Hotham River, starts its journey near Narrogin. The other major tributary is the Williams River, which starts between Williams and Narrogin. These two tributaries are the main rivers which drain the eastern wheat-belt.

The Murray River then flows through forested high-rainfall parts of the Darling Range to emerge near Pinjarra.

Another tributary, the Dandalup River, joins the Murray a short distance downstream of Pinjarra. This section is known as the lower Murray and is navigable in small boats. The river then flows across the sand plain between the Darling Scarp and the coast to empty into the Peel Estuary near Mandurah.

The canal development of North and South Yunderup is situated several kilometres upstream from the estuary.

History
This was later named the Serpentine River, which is to the north of the Murray and for some time was confused with the Murray, which was not encountered until later that year.

In November, Dr Alexander Collie and Lieutenant William Preston and crew from  piloted two whaleboats out of Cockburn Sound and at midday on 17 November 1829 crossed the ocean bar at present day Mandurah. After camping overnight, they sailed south down the Peel-Harvey Estuary to the southern extreme near the delta of the Harvey River, where they had an amicable encounter with some local Aboriginal people.

Due to strong winds, they sailed north out of the estuary without exploring the Eastern shore where the Murray River enters the estuary. The group then exited through the ocean bar and sailed south along the coast as far as the Collie and Preston Rivers and the Leschenault Inlet before returning to the Peel-Harvey estuary on 28 November 1829. From there they explored the Murray River delta, which at the time included five entrances into the estuary. The boats managed to navigate about  up the river before returning to Fremantle after the 12-day trip. This was their first actual encounter with the Murray River and it was named by Governor James Stirling after the Secretary of State for the Colonial Office in London, Sir George Murray.

Within a few months, settlers from the Swan River had started to explore the river and choose blocks along its banks.

Thomas Peel
As he arrived six weeks late and with only 169 settlers, the offer was withdrawn by Stirling as the land had been granted to established settlers. Peel was offered an alternative grant from Woodman Point to the north bank of the Murray River and from the ocean to the Darling Scarp.

Peel's remaining settlers arrived shortly after and settled initially at Clarence before moving to the site of present-day Mandurah, which he named Peeltown.

Despite many problems faced by the settlers, the area was gradually expanded and a settlement at Pinjarra had been established by late 1830.  Pinjarra was approximately the upper limit of navigable water along the Murray River. It also had a natural ford for travellers at nearby Oakley Brook.

More land allocations along the southern bank of the river were made; however, settlement seemed to be limited to no further south that the Murray River grants, partly because of continuing and increasing conflicts with local Aboriginal people.  These conflicts culminated in the infamous Pinjarra massacre in October 1834 during which an uncertain number of Noongar people of the local Pindjarup tribal group were killed.  The massacre by a detachment of 25 soldiers, police and settlers, and led personally by Stirling, followed a raid in Perth by members of the Murray River tribe. The following year, a formal truce was made between the Murray River and the Swan River Noongars and the white settlers.

Relative peace was established and expansion around the towns of Pinjarra increased.  The opening of the Perth to Bunbury railway in 1893 further expanded the area.
The problem was exacerbated by extensive clearing of trees in the foothills which would have otherwise helped in removing the excess water. Settlers described a giant wetland with travel impossible for several months each year.

From 1900 to about the end of the Second World War, a concerted effort at draining the flood-prone areas was made and today, about one-third of all land with the Peel-Harvey catchment is within  of a constructed drain, stream or river.

See also

List of watercourses in Western Australia

Notes

References

External links

Rivers of the Peel region
Darling Range